Yu Seung-min, Yu Sŭng-min, Ryu Seung-min, or Ryu Sŭng-min may refer to:
Yoo Seong-min (born 1958), South Korean politician
Ryu Seung-min (born 1982), South Korean table tennis player